Roam (often stylized as ROAM) were a British rock band from Eastbourne in England. The band consists of vocalist Alex Costello, bass guitarist Matt Roskilly, lead guitarist and backing vocalist Alex Adam, rhythm guitarist Sam Veness, and drummer Miles Gill.

History

Formation, signing and early recordings (2012–15)
Roam formed in September 2012 in Eastbourne, England. The group began performing in November 2012. The band began producing original music in early 2012, and independently released two EPs, No Common Ground, which was released in 2012, and Head Down, which was released in 2013. The group was signed to Hopeless Records in 2014 and soon afterwards released the Viewpoint EP in 2015.

Backbone and Great Heights & Nosedives (2016–18) 

The band released its  debut album, Backbone, on 22 January 2016, through Hopeless. Following the release of the band's debut album Backbone, the band supported Sum 41 during Kerrang! Tour 2016.

On 29 February, Roam announced that the band had parted with its drummer Charlie Pearson, stating that "We are extremely thankful for all his work and commitment to us over the past three years, and wish him the very best in the future." The band also stated that in shows following Pearson's departure, drummer Miles Gill would serve as touring drummer at the band's performances. The band performed on every date of the 2016 Warped Tour. In August 2016, the group announced that Miles Gill would join the band full-time.

On 21 August 2017, the band announced that their second album, Great Heights & Nosedives, would be released on 13 October.

Smile Wide (2019–2022) 
On 1 July 2019, the band announced their third album, Smile Wide would be released on 6 September and dropped the first single "I Don't Think I Live There Anymore". On 22 July they released a second single titled "Piranha".

Together with the band With Confidence, they toured Europe and the United Kingdom in September and October 2019.

On 21 June 2022, the band announced that they are splitting up and will play several farewell shows.

Musical style
Roam's music is pop punk. AllMusic biographer Neil Yeung noted that the band "took cues from New Found Glory, Blink-182, Sum 41, and Simple Plan".

Discography 
Studio albums 

Extended plays 

Music videos

Band members

Last members
Alex Costello – lead vocals (2012–2022)
Matt Roskilly – bass guitar (2012–2022)
Alex Adam – lead guitar, backing vocals (2012–2022)
Sam Veness – rhythm guitar (2012–2022)
Miles Gill - drums <small> (2016–2022) <small>

Former members
Charlie Pearson – drums, percussion (2012–2016)

Timeline

References
Citations

Sources

External links 
 

Musical groups established in 2012
Musical groups disestablished in 2022
English pop punk groups
Hopeless Records artists
2012 establishments in England
2022 disestablishments in England